Gan is a surname. It may be a Latin-alphabet spelling of four different Chinese surnames (respectively pronounced in Mandarin as ), a Korean surname (written using the same character as the Chinese surname Jiǎn), and a surname in other cultures.

Origins
As a Chinese surname, Gan may be one of the following surnames, listed by their spelling in Pinyin, which reflects the Mandarin Chinese pronunciation:
Gān. Ancient sources differ on the origin of this surname. Yuanhe Xingzuan states that the first bearer of the surname was an official in the court of King Wu Ding, while  states that it originated as a toponymic surname, referring to a place called Gan District, located in what is now Huyi District, Xi'an, Shaanxi, where some descendants of King Wen of Zhou had settled.
Gān, homophonous with the above surname in Mandarin Chinese, though not in other varieties of Chinese.
Yán, spelled Gan based on its Hokkien pronunciation. (1) Yan You (颜友) was the first king of the Xiao Zhu (Ni) state [小邾(倪)国] and was originally known as Cao You (曹友). His ancestor was called Yan An (晏安) who inherited a piece of land, which later flourished into the Zhu kingdom, a feudal state of Lu (魯國). According to the judicial rules of that time, Cao You had to give up his surname in order to ascend the throne. He adopted his father Yi Fu's style name Bo Yan. From then on Cao You was known as Yan You (颜友). This officially made Yan You the first Yan in Chinese history.  Yan An (晏安) was the son of Luzhong (陸終), grandson of Zhurong clan (祝融) and Wuhui (吳回). Zhurong was said to be the son of Gaoyang (also known as Zhuanxu), a sky god. Zhuanxu was a grandson of the Yellow Emperor. (2) Cao (曹) are believed to be descended of the ancient Zhou kings (Ji (姬) was the ancestral name of the Zhou dynasty). The surname is derived of a kingdom called the State of Cao.  The Ji (姬) family is traced from the miraculous birth of the Xia dynasty culture hero and court official Houji, a previously barren wife of the Emperor Ku (this origin allowed his descendants to claim a lineage from the Yellow Emperor as well) caused by his mother's stepping into a footprint left by the supreme god Shangdi. Shaohao is usually identified as a son of the Yellow Emperor. According to some traditions , he is a member of the Five Emperors.
Jiǎn, spelled Gan (or more commonly Kan) based on its Cantonese pronunciation

As a Korean surname, Gan is the Revised Romanization of Korean spelling of the surname written using the hanja , the same one which is used to write the Chinese surname Jiǎn mentioned above. The bearers of this surname in Korea identify with a number of bon-gwan, which are hometowns of a clan lineage. The clan's founding ancestor Gan Gyun, an official under Myeongjong of Goryeo, settled in Gapyeong County, Gyeonggi Province, which became the clan hometown.

Another surname with the same origin is McGann.

The Ashkenazi Jewish surnames Gan and Gang are short for Gangolf, which itself originated by metathesis from the German masculine given name Wolfgang. Gan is further the origin of the patronymic surnames Ganer, Ganel, and Ganet. Gan also coincidentally means "garden" in Modern Hebrew.

Statistics
According to statistics cited by Patrick Hanks, 328 people on the island of Great Britain and eight on the island of Ireland bore the surname Gan as of 2011. In 1881 there had been 40 people in Great Britain with the surname Gan, primarily at Durham, Northumberland, Lancashire, Argyll, and London.

The 2000 South Korean census found 2,429 people in 753 households with the surname spelled Gan in Revised Romanization.

The 2010 United States Census found 2,891 people with the surname Gan, making it the 11,003rd-most-common name in the country. This represented an increase from 2,301 (12,343rd-most-common) in the 2000 Census. In the 2010 census, about three-quarters of the bearers of the surname identified as Asian (up from three-fifths in the 2000 census), and two-tenths as White (down from three-tenths in the 2000 census). It was the 310th-most-common surname among respondents to the 2000 Census who identified as Asian.

People

Chinese surname 甘
Gan De, Chinese astronomer and astrologer of the State of Qi
Gan Ying, Chinese military ambassador sent on a mission to Rome
Gan Ning, Eastern Han dynasty military general
Gan Siqi (1903–1964), Chinese People's Liberation Army general
Gan Yetao (1907–2002), Chinese diplomat
Gan Yang (born 1952), Chinese political philosopher
Gan Rongkun (born 1962), Chinese politician
Jay Gan (born 1963), Chinese-born American agricultural and environmental scientist
Gan Yao-ming (born 1972), Taiwanese writer
Gan Wei (born 1984), Chinese actress
Gan Rui (born 1985), Chinese football midfielder
Gan Tingting (born 1986), Chinese actress
Gan Tiancheng (born 1995), Chinese football forward
Gan Quan (born 1996), Chinese baseball pitcher

Chinese surname 干
Gan Jiang, swordsmith of the Spring and Autumn period
Gan Ji (died 200), Eastern Han dynasty Taoist priest
Gan Bao, Eastern Jin dynasty historian
Gan Yingbo (born 1985), Chinese football manager

Chinese surname 顏

Gan Kim Yong (born 1959), Singaporean politician (People's Action Party)
Gan Thiam Poh (born 1963), Singaporean politician (People's Action Party)
Steven Gan (born ), Malaysian journalist
Frankie Gan (born 1966), Malaysian politician (Malaysian Chinese Association)
Gan Peck Cheng (born 1966), Malaysian politician (Democratic Action Party)
Gan Ping Sieu (born 1966), Malaysian politician (Malaysian Chinese Association)
Gan Wee Teck (born 1972), Malaysian mathematician
Gan Siow Huang (born 1975), Singaporean general
Jeremy Gan (born 1979), Malaysian badminton player
Gan Teik Chai (born 1983), Malaysian badminton player
Gan Mei Yan (born 1984), Malaysian radio announcer
Brendan Gan (born 1988), Malaysian football midfielder
Heidi Gan (born 1988), Malaysian swimmer
Luisa Gan (born 1994), Singaporean actress

Other or unknown
Aleksei Gan (1887 or 1893 – 1942), Russian anarchist avant-garde artist
Chester Gan (1908–1959), American actor of Chinese descent
Rafał Gan-Ganowicz (1932–2002), Polish exile and mercenary
Jennifer Gan (1938–2000), American actress
Pinchas Cohen Gan (born 1942), Israeli painter
Steve Gan (born 1945), Filipino comics artist
Barry L. Gan (born 1948), American philosophy professor
Samuel Gan (born 1981), Singaporean biologist
Shyam Gan (born 1998), Indian cricketer
Gan Ching Hwee (born 2003), Singaporean swimmer

Fictional characters
 Olag Gan, in the British television series Blake's 7 (1978–1981)

References

Chinese-language surnames
Jewish surnames
Korean-language surnames
Multiple Chinese surnames